Somchai Thingpakdee (born 5 June 1947) is a Thai sports shooter. He competed in the men's 50 metre free pistol event at the 1984 Summer Olympics.

References

1947 births
Living people
Somchai Thingpakdee
Somchai Thingpakdee
Shooters at the 1984 Summer Olympics
Place of birth missing (living people)
Shooters at the 1982 Asian Games
Asian Games medalists in shooting
Somchai Thingpakdee
Medalists at the 1982 Asian Games
Somchai Thingpakdee